The Finance and Expenditure Committee (known as the Public Accounts Committee until 1962, and as the Public Expenditure Committee, from 1962) is a select committee of the House of Representatives, the unicameral chamber of the New Zealand Parliament, responsible for matters relating to the audit of the financial statements of the Government and departments, Government finance, revenue, and taxation. The committee is currently established by Standing Order 189.

History
Following a reform of the former Public Accounts Committee in 1962, the Public Expenditure Committee was established and became the most influential parliamentary committee in New Zealand,  establishing "a strong reputation for itself, principally because it enjoyed powers of investigation not granted to other committees and because it attracted able and ambitious members. It was the only committee able to set up its own inquiries (without reference from the House), had subcommittees chaired by opposition members, and enjoyed the support of staff from the Legislative department (now the Office of the Clerk) as well as the Audit Office."

Jurisdiction
This committee looks at business related to economic and fiscal policy, taxation, revenue, banking and finance, superannuation, insurance, Government expenditure and financial performance, and public audit.

Ministers answerable
The wide scope of the committee's oversight means a number of government ministers are answerable to the committee. The table below lists them, and their position:

Membership

53rd Parliament
The following table lists the membership of the committee during the 53rd Parliament:

52nd Parliament
The following table lists the membership of the committee during the 52nd Parliament:

50th Parliament
The following table lists the membership of the committee during the 50th Parliament:

44th Parliament
The following table lists the membership of the committee during the 44th Parliament:

Richardson resigned in July 1994 and was replaced by John Robertson as a member and Bradford as chairperson.

43rd Parliament
The following table lists the membership of the committee during the 43rd Parliament:

42nd Parliament
The following table lists the membership of the committee during the 42nd Parliament:

41st Parliament
The following table lists the membership of the committee during the 41st Parliament:

40th Parliament
The following table lists the membership of the committee during the 40th Parliament:

39th Parliament
The following table lists the membership of the committee during the 39th Parliament:

37th Parliament
The following table lists the membership of the committee during the 37th Parliament:

See also
New Zealand House of Representatives committees

References

Parliament of New Zealand